WLVS-FM (106.5 FM, "Sunny 106.5") is a radio station licensed to serve Clifton, Tennessee, United States. The station is owned by the Gold Coast Broadcasting Company.

Programming
Until August 3, 2017 it broadcast a country music format as a simulcast partner to WXFL ("Kix 96") in Florence, Alabama.  WLVS-FM can be heard in Clifton, Decaturville, Savannah, Parsons, and Waynesboro, Tennessee. WLVS-FM is also available in more areas of Wayne County, Tennessee, Hardin County, Tennessee, Decatur County, Tennessee, and Perry County, Tennessee.

History
This station received its original construction permit from the Federal Communications Commission on August 18, 1999.  The new station was assigned the call letters WLVS-FM by the FCC on March 14, 2000.

In March 2000, Clifton Radio, LLC, reached an agreement to transfer the permit for this still-under construction station to the Gold Coast Broadcasting Company for a reported sale price of $75,000. The deal was approved by the FCC on May 1, 2000, and the transaction was consummated on June 28, 2000.  WLVS-FM received its license to cover from the FCC on October 25, 2002.

On August 3, 2017 WLVS changed their format from country to adult contemporary, branded as "Sunny 106.5". (info taken from stationintel.com)

References

External links

LVS-FM
Mainstream adult contemporary radio stations in the United States
Wayne County, Tennessee